Bibliomist is a program of Ukrainian libraries' modernization. Bibliomist is expanding access to information and modern technology through equipping up to 1 800 public libraries with technology by 2014; training librarians to use new technology at 25 training centers, and improving computer literacy among patrons at participating libraries across the country, helping librarians advocate for libraries and raise necessary resources to serve community needs, promoting modern Ukrainian libraries among the general public.

History

Bibliomist is a part of Global Libraries initiative of Bill and Melinda Gates Foundation (BMGF) implemented in Chile, Mexico, Botswana, Lithuania, Latvia, Romania, Ukraine, Poland, Bulgaria, Vietnam and Moldova. The goal of the initiative is to support and sustain free public access to computers and the Internet globally and to bridge the digital divide.

The underlying idea is that access to information helps people change their lives and that it is essential in today’s globalized society. Under this initiative, BMGF provides funding to purchase computer equipment, train librarians in modern technology use and by these means help libraries become modern community and information centers.

Bibliomist program was launched in 2009 based on the results of needs assessment of public libraries "Public Libraries as Points of Public Access to Information, Technology and the Internet"<ref> </ref> (2008) conducted by the Ukrainian Library Association (ULA) and supported by IREX.
In Ukraine, more than 75% of people lack regular access to the Internet. While Ukraine has made rapid economic advances over the last two decades, libraries have been largely left behind, and, as a result, millions are without critical access to the information they need. Through Bibliomist, public libraries are becoming vital community centers where citizens can obtain important information available online and receive assistance from a qualified librarian.

Structure

Bibliomist is a partnership of the following organizations: International Research and Exchanges Board (IREX), selected by the Bill and Melinda Gates Foundation to implement Bibliomist in Ukraine, the Ukrainian Library Association (ULA), Microsoft, which donates an estimated $9 million in software to Ukraine’s public libraries, as part of its global initiative to endow communities with accessible and useful technology and the Ministry of Culture of Ukraine.
A Protocol of Intentions between the Ministry of Culture and IREX regarding implementation of project "Bibliomist" was signed in Kyiv on December 8, 2008. The Ministry of Culture provides overall project supervision of Bibliomist.

Activity

Bibliomist awards funding to public libraries on a competitive basis through a series of contests: "Public Access Contest", "Community Participation Contest" (small grants), "Learning Libraries", "Outreach contest". Besides, librarians are encouraged to participate in various professional development programs, such as "Library Leadership Program", and take part in different online contests.

Selected examples of Bibliomist projects
Library+Internet=Better Crops
Ternopil oblast farmers were able to increase tomato crops thanks to information about better sorts found on the Internet in a local library with the help of a qualified librarian.

Interested in Better Job Opportunities? Visit Your Library!
Tetyana Nishkur from Kherson struggled to find a job after being laid off as a teacher. With the help of her local library, she developed a business plan and opened a kayak rental and tourism business. Tetyana, now the owner of a thriving business, continues to rely on her library for internet access and training.

«Library +» Presents Bibliotram
Lviv central library for children and youth, winner of Community Participation Contest (CPC) implemented “Library+” project under which patrons decorated a tram with the libraries’ advertisement and information about their services. The tram’s route was designed to pass by several libraries and the stops were given library-related names. During the trip, passengers took part in contests, presentations of new books, multimedia resources and clubs.

Ternopil Oblast Youth Library - 2.0 in Your Favor
Ternopil Oblast Youth Library teaches young people to use Web 2.0 technologies and demonstrates their advantages to youth librarians, school librarians, students of “Vyfleyem” orphanage, leaders of oblast NGOs for people with special needs and all of the library patrons.

State Institutions "State Youth Library of Ukraine” – Safe and Friendly Web Space
The project of State Youth Library of Ukraine is dedicated to web communication and netiquette. It is based on the all-Ukrainian sociological survey, whose results showed that 57,8% of respondents did not know that one had to adhere to certain culture of communication on the Internet and over 90% confirmed the wish to learn more about netiquette and suggested ways of receiving information, convenient for them. In response the library designs and holds trainings on shaping network culture for professionals (library staff, employees of academic institutions), parents and youth.

References

External links
Official web site
"Bibliotechny Autobahn" blog
IREX official site

See also

Library
Bill & Melinda Gates Foundation
United States Agency for International Development

Ukrainian literature
Bill & Melinda Gates Foundation
Libraries in Ukraine